Konstancja Skirmuntt (also Konstancja Skirmunttówna, ; 1851–1934) was an amateur Polish-Lithuanian historian, a member of the Krajowcy movement who wanted to preserve the dual Polish-Lithuanian identity. Born to a noble family of deep roots in the former Grand Duchy of Lithuania, Skirmuntt spent most of her life in or near Pinsk. Without any formal education in history, she wrote four major historical works that romanticized and idealized the past. Written in easy and accessible language, they became popular. She also published articles in Polish and Lithuanian press debating the issues of the Polish-Lithuanian identity. She supported the Lithuanian National Revival, but opposed both Lithuanian and Polish nationalism. After World War I, she published criticism of the Second Polish Republic and its policies and attitudes towards its ethnic minorities.

Biography
Her family of local nobles traced their lineage to the 13th century. Her mother, Helena Skirmunt, was a painter and sculptor. As many other children of the nobility, Skirmuntt was educated at home by tutors. Both of her parents supported the January Uprising of 1863, were arrested and exiled to Russia. The children were left in the care of their aging grandmother who sent Skirmutt to study in Kalisz. In 1869, when her parents were released from exile, Skirmuntt accompanied them to Crimea. She left a vivid and impressive description of her travels in the Crimea, with special emphasis placed on the local caves and the so-called "cave towns and monasteries". She returned after her mother's death in 1874, and continued to live in Pinsk until her death in 1934. She never married and had no children.

Works
Her first work on the history of Lithuania was published under the pen name Pojata in 1886. In 1897–1909, she published a three-volume work on the prehistory and early history of Lithuania. She romanticized and idealized the past, praised and glorified various Grand Dukes (especially Grand Duke Vytautas), criticized Jogaila, vilified the Teutonic Order. Her books were written in easy accessible language and were translated to Lithuanian becoming very popular among the activists of the Lithuanian National Revival. She also wrote numerous articles on political and ethnic issues to Polish and Lithuanian press, including Kraj, Przegląd Wileński, Kurier Wileński, Litwa, often using pen name Futurus. Two collections of her articles were published in 1907 and 1913. She corresponded with Eliza Orzeszkowa, Polish positivist writer.

During the tenure of Prime Minister Pyotr Stolypin, she managed to protect a Catholic church from destruction in Haradzišča, a village near Pinsk. In 1910, together with Marian Zdziechowski, she unsuccessfully worked to bring a Lithuanian delegation to the 500th anniversary celebrations of the Battle of Grunwald in Kraków. In 1911–1912, she unsuccessfully campaigned for a Lithuanian Faculty at the Jagiellonian University. For her works and efforts, she was awarded the Pro Ecclesia et Pontifice by the Vatican and an honorary doctorate by the Vytautas Magnus University.

Political views
Skirmuntt supported the Lithuanian National Revival and corresponded with such Lithuanian activists as Jonas Basanavičius and Adomas Jakštas, but she did not support either Lithuanian or Polish nationalism. She identified as a Lithuanian, but spoke Polish and supported a union between Poland and Lithuania in the historic traditions of the Polish–Lithuanian Commonwealth (see: Krajowcy). In 1914, she published a 10-page Lithuanian-language brochure Nosce te ipsum in which she criticized the division into "us" and "them" solely based on the language – she lamented the fact that Lithuanians have rejected poet Adam Mickiewicz or composer Stanisław Moniuszko solely because they wrote in Polish. While her historical works were popular, she faced criticism and was shunned by both Poles (who considered her a "separatist") and Lithuanians (who did not consider her to be a true Lithuanian). Seeing the inevitable rise of nationalism, she referred to herself as the "last Mohican" in a letter to Basanavičius.

After World War I, Pinsk became a part of the Second Polish Republic. She criticized the Żeligowski's Mutiny (by which Poland captured Vilnius from Lithuania) and Polish policies toward ethnic minorities. She urged Poland to understand and respect people living in Kresy who were of different nationality and culture than the Polish people. She expressed these views in Idea jagiellońska a polityka kresowa published in 1925 and brochure Kwestja zasad published in 1933. At the same time, she criticized the Lithuanian government for signing the Soviet–Lithuanian Peace Treaty in 1920 or the Constituent Assembly of Lithuania for launching a land reform which nationalized land owned by the nobility.

Bibliography
Her major works were:
 Dzieje Litwy opowiedziane w zarysie (History of Lithuania in an Outline; 1886; translated to Lithuanian in 1887–1888 and French in 1901)
 Z najstarszych czasów plemienia litewskiego (From the Oldest Times of the Lithuanians; 1892; republished in 1897 as the first volume of the Nad Niemnem i nad Bałtykiem series)
 Nad Niemnem i nad Bałtykiem (Along the Neman and the Baltic), three volumes:
 W zaraniu dziejów (The Dawn of History; 1897)
 Podania; Czasy przed-Mendogowe; Dzieje starożytnych Prus (Legends, Pre-Mindaugas Times, History of Ancient Prussia; 1903; translated to Lithuanian in 1922)
 Mindog, król Litwy (Mindaugas, King of Lithuania; 1909; first published in Lithuanian in 1908)
 Idea jagiellońska a polityka kresowa (Jagiellonian Idea and the Borderland Policy; 1925)

References

1851 births
1934 deaths
19th-century Lithuanian nobility
20th-century Lithuanian nobility
People from Stolin District
People from Pinsky Uyezd
Belarusian nobility
Clan of Dąb
19th-century Belarusian historians
20th-century Belarusian historians
Women historians
Historians of Lithuania